East Fourth Street Historic District may refer to:
East Fourth Street Historic District (Cincinnati, Ohio)
East 4th Street District (Cleveland)